Nhandu coloratovillosus also known as the Brazilian black & white tarantula or  the bombardier tarantula, is a species of tarantula first described by Günter Schmidt in 1998. They are found in the grasslands of Brazil and Paraguay, and are terrestrial tarantulas.

Description 
Females live 15 years, while males only to 4 years. Their carapace is black, with an alternating black and white pattern, starting with black and ending with black. Their legs and opisthosoma are covered in orange hairs, making the white parts of the legs look dirty. Their opisthosoma is black covered in long orange hairs.

Habitat 
They are found in the grasslands of Brazil and Paraguay. These grasslands may reach temperatures of up to 35 °C, and are in the negatives during winter. In these grasslands there is an average yearly rainfall of 1,200mm.

Behavior 
They are terrestrial tarantulas, each with their own personality. Some are incredibly docile, while others are way more nervous and skittish. Though must of them are willing to fling urticating hairs.

References 

Spiders of Brazil
Spiders of South America
Spiders described in 1998
Theraphosidae